Prothoe is a genus of charaxine butterflies in the family Nymphalidae. Two of the three species are virtually restricted to western and central Melanesia, but the most widespread species, P. franck, occurs throughout a large part of South-East Asia and as far northwest as Assam in India.

Taxonomy
Species in this genus are:
 Prothoe australis (Guérin-Méneville, [1831])
 Prothoe ribbei Rothschild, 1895
 Prothoe franck (Godart, [1824])

References

 
Butterfly genera
Taxa named by Jacob Hübner